Fernando Lopez (1904–1993) was a Filipino statesman.

Fernando López may also refer to:
 Fernando López Tuero (1857–1907), Puerto Rican agricultural scientist and agronomist
 Fernando López (equestrian) (1908–2006), Spanish Olympic equestrian
 Fernando López (pitcher) (born 1952), Mexican baseball player (See 1977 Caribbean Series)
 Fernando López Arias (1905–1978), Mexican politician and governor of Veracruz
 Fernando López (Chilean footballer) (born 1980), Chilean footballer
 Fernando López (Spanish footballer) (born 1983), Spanish footballer
 Fernando López (Mexican footballer) (born 1984), Mexican football defender
 Fernando López (rugby union), Argentine-born Spanish rugby union player